The 2017 The Hague Open was a professional tennis tournament played on clay courts. It was the 25th edition of the tournament and was part of the 2017 ATP Challenger Tour. It took place in Scheveningen, Netherlands between 17 and 23 July 2017.

Singles main-draw entrants

Seeds

 1 Rankings are as of 3 July 2017.

Other entrants
The following players received wildcards into the singles main draw:
  Thiemo de Bakker
  Michiel de Krom
  Robin Haase
  Botic van de Zandschulp

The following player received entry into the singles main draw using a protected ranking:
  Simone Bolelli

The following players received entry from the qualifying draw:
  Juan Ignacio Londero
  Marko Tepavac
  Sem Verbeek
  George von Massow

The following player received entry as a lucky loser:
  Maverick Banes

Champions

Singles

 Guillermo García López def.  Ruben Bemelmans 6–1, 6–7(3–7), 6–2.

Doubles

 Sander Gillé /  Joran Vliegen def.  Jozef Kovalík /  Stefanos Tsitsipas 6–2, 4–6, [12–10].

External links
Official Website

2017 ATP Challenger Tour
2017
2017 in Dutch tennis